Willy Rizzo (22 October 1928 – 25 February 2013) was an Italian photographer and designer.

Publications
Starsociety, editor Schirmer Mosel, 1994
Mes stars : L'Album secret de Willy Rizzo, text of Jean-Pierre de Lucovich, editor Filipacchi, 2003
Willy Rizzo, Contrejour, 2014
Chanel by Willy Rizzo, texts of Fabrice Gaignault, Edmonde Charles-Roux, Olivier Saillard, Arnold de Contades et Danniel Rangel, editor Minerve, 2015

References

 https://www.willyrizzo.com/biographie-willy-rizzo.html

External links
 www.willyrizzo.com — Official site
 Mid-Century Online – Magazine | Willy Rizzo: The essence of La Dolce Vita

1928 births
2013 deaths
Photographers from Naples
Italian photojournalists
Italian furniture designers
Burials at Père Lachaise Cemetery